Cause Célèbre or A Woman of Principle is a 1975 radio play, and the final play by the English author Terence Rattigan. It was inspired by the trial of Alma Rattenbury and her teenage lover in 1935 for the murder of her third husband Francis Rattenbury and first broadcast by the BBC on 27 October 1975. Alma was played by Diana Dors. Rattigan was then commissioned to rewrite it into a stage play ready to be produced in Autumn 1976, but his terminal cancer and casting problems meant he was only able to start work in January 1977, alongside director Robin Midgley. This stage version premiered at the Haymarket Theatre, Leicester in 1977 before its West End premiere on 4 July 1977 at Her Majesty's Theatre in London, with Glynis Johns as Alma Rattenbury and Helen Lindsay as Edith Davenport. It received largely positive reviews. Rattigan checked himself out of hospital to attend the opening night.

A 1987 television version of the stage play starred Helen Mirren as Alma. The stage play itself was revived at the Old Vic from March to June 2011 to mark Rattigan's centenary, directed by Thea Sharrock and with Alma played by Anne-Marie Duff and Edith Davenport by Niamh Cusack. Reviews were mainly very positive, with The Guardian calling it a "fine revival," of a play which "stands the test of time." Though the London Evening Standard regretted that "this is not Rattigan at his most eloquently anguished."  A new production of the radio play was aired by BBC Radio 4 on 25 June 2011, again directed by Sharrock, with original music by Adrian Johnston.

Old Vic cast
 Joan Webster ..... Lucy Black
 Francis Rattenbury .... Timothy Carlton
 John Davenport .... Simon Chandler
 Croom-Johnson ..... Richard Clifford
 Christopher .... Oliver Coopersmith
 Christopher (Understudy) - Oscar Dunbar
 Edith Davenport .... Niamh Cusack
 Alma Rattenbury ..... Anne-Marie Duff
 Ewen Montagu ..... Rory Fleck-Byrne
 Tony Davenport .... Freddie Fox
 Irene Riggs .... Jenny Galloway
 Judge ...... Patrick Godfrey
 O'Connor .... Nicholas Jones
 George Wood .......Tommy McDonnell
 Stella Morrison ....... Lucy Robinson
 Clerk of the court .....Tristan Shepherd
 Casswell ....... Richard Teverson
 Wardress ....... Sarah Waddell
 Sergeant Bagwell ....... Michael Webber
 Coroner ....... Tristram Wymark

References
Terence Rattigan: highlights of the British Library exhibition
Lost letters bought for £22 reveal Terence Rattigan's professionalism
Cause Célèbre
Review | Old Vic | Cause Célèbre | Michael Billington
Terence Rattigan plays: timeline and synopsis
TV WEEKEND; A Murder Trial That Shocked England (Published 1988)
Cause Celebre is not Rattigan at his most eloquently anguished

1977 plays
1975 radio dramas
British radio dramas
Plays by Terence Rattigan
Hamish Hamilton books
West End plays